Camel's Hump State Forest (alternatively Camels Hump State Forest) covers a total of  in two blocks in the U.S. state of Vermont. Stevens Block comprises  in Buels Gore, Fayston, and Starksboro in Chittenden, Washington, and Addison counties, respectively. The forest is managed by the Vermont Department of Forests, Parks and Recreation.

Description

The Stevens Block of Camel's Hump State Forest is managed for wildlife habitat and timber resources. The Long Trail skirts the eastern edge of this block of the forest. Parking is available at Appalachian Gap on Vermont Route 17.

The Howe Block of Camel's Hump State Forest is a popular mountain biking destination. There are numerous trails in the area including Busternut Trail, Clinic Trail, Cyclone Trail, and Enchanted Forest Trail. Parking is available at either end of Tucker Hill Road in Fayston.

See also

 Camel's Hump
 Camel's Hump Forest Reserve
 Camel's Hump State Park

Bibliography

References

Vermont state forests
Protected areas of Chittenden County, Vermont
Protected areas of Washington County, Vermont
Protected areas of Addison County, Vermont
Buels Gore, Vermont
Fayston, Vermont
Starksboro, Vermont
Waitsfield, Vermont